Boiteau is a surname. Notable people with it include:

 Arnaud Boiteau (born 1973), French equestrian
 Pierre Boiteau (1911–1980), French botanist